Antti Kuisma (born 23 February 1978 in Jyväskylä) is a Nordic combined athlete from Finland who won a bronze medal at the 2006 Winter Olympics in the 4 x 5 km team event. He finished 17th in the 15 km individual event at those same games.

His best finish at the FIS Nordic World Ski Championships was fifth in the 15 km individual at Oberstdorf in 2005.

Kuisma competed from 2000 to 2008.

References
FIS Newsflash 177 on Kuisma's retirement. 30 April 2008.

 

1978 births
Finnish male Nordic combined skiers
Living people
Nordic combined skiers at the 2006 Winter Olympics
Olympic bronze medalists for Finland
Olympic Nordic combined skiers of Finland
Sportspeople from Jyväskylä
Olympic medalists in Nordic combined
Medalists at the 2006 Winter Olympics
21st-century Finnish people